Amentotaxus assamica is a species of conifer in the family Taxaceae. It is found only in India. It is threatened by habitat loss.

References

assamica
Taxonomy articles created by Polbot
Plants described in 1985